{{Taxobox
| name = Chiloglanis sp. nov. 'Northern Ewaso Nyiro| image = 
| status = DD | status_system = IUCN3.1
| regnum = Animalia
| phylum = Chordata
| classis = Actinopterygii
| ordo = Siluriformes
| familia = Mochokidae
| genus = Chiloglanis
| species = C. sp. nov. 'Northern Ewaso Nyiro'| binomial = Chiloglanis sp. nov. 'Northern Ewaso Nyiro| binomial_authority = 
| synonyms = 
}}Chiloglanis sp. nov. 'Northern Ewaso Nyiro' is a species of fish in the family Mochokidae. It is endemic to Kenya. Its natural habitat is rivers.

Sources 

Undescribed vertebrate species
sp. nov. 'Northern Ewaso Nyiro'
Endemic freshwater fish of Kenya
Taxonomy articles created by Polbot
Taxobox binomials not recognized by IUCN